Frederick Road may refer to:
Frederick Road (Rockville) in Maryland, United States
Frederick Road (Baltimore) in Maryland, United States